The William Jewell Cardinals are the athletic teams that represent the William Jewell College, located in Liberty, Missouri, in intercollegiate sports as a member of the NCAA Division II ranks, primarily competing in the Great Lakes Valley Conference (GLVC) since the 2011–12 academic year. Prior to joining the NCAA, the Cardinals previously competed in the Heart of America Conference (HAAC) of the National Association of Intercollegiate Athletics (NAIA) from 1971–72 to 2010–11; and in the Missouri College Athletic Union (MCAU) from 1924–25 to 1970–71.

Varsity teams
William Jewell competes in 25 intercollegiate varsity sports: Men's sports include baseball, basketball, cross country, football, golf, lacrosse, soccer, swimming, tennis, track & field and wrestling; while women's sports include basketball, cross country, golf, lacrosse, soccer, softball, swimming, tennis, track & field, volleyball and wrestling; and co-ed powerlifting.

National championships

Team

References

External links